Bastareus (fl. 4th century BC), was an ancient king of Thrace, known only from a rare coin bearing his name.  He was perhaps Paeonian.

References

Paeonian kings
Year of birth unknown
4th-century BC births
4th-century BC rulers
Year of death unknown